Suolisjärvi is a medium-sized lake in the Paatsjoki main catchment area. It is located in the eastern Lapland region in Finland. The lake is in the border of Vätsäri Wilderness Area.

See also
List of lakes in Finland

References

Lakes of Inari, Finland